Col du Soulor (elevation )  is a mountain pass in the Pyrenees in France, linking Argelès-Gazost with Arthez-d'Asson. It connects the Ouzom and Arens valleys. A road leaves the pass to the west to reach the higher Col d'Aubisque.

The road over the col is regularly  used in the Tour de France cycling race, normally in conjunction with the Col d'Aubisque.

Details of the climbs
It rises , an average gradient of 5.2%. It gets tough after Arrens-Marsous with stretches at 10% or steeper.

The col can also be reached from the north, via the D126. Over this distance, the climb gains , at an average of 4.9%. The real climbing, however, comes at Ferrières, after which the gradient increases to 9%. This was the direction used in the 2010 Tour de France.

Tour de France
The Col du Soulor was first used in the 1910 Tour de France and was most recently featured in the 17th stage of the 2010 Tour de France, as a category 1 climb.

The Col du Soulor is also crossed during the passage over the Col d'Aubisque. When this route is used, for example in stage 16 of the 2012 Tour de France, it is often not a categorized climb, since the amount of re-ascent from the west is relatively small. It has, however, been a categorized climb on 12 occasions, including in 1982 as a hors catégorie climb.

Passages in the Tour de France (since 1947) 
The categorized crossings of the Col du Soulor since 1947 were as follows:

See also
 Souvenir Henri Desgrange

References

External links 

Col du Soulor on Google Maps (Tour de France classic climbs)

Mountain passes of the Pyrenees
Mountain passes of Nouvelle-Aquitaine
Mountain passes of Hautes-Pyrénées
Landforms of Pyrénées-Atlantiques
Transport in Nouvelle-Aquitaine
Transport in Occitania (administrative region)